Eucalyptus caesia, commonly known as caesia or gungurru, is a species of mallee that is endemic to the south-west of Western Australia. It has smooth reddish brown bark at first, later shedding in curling flakes, lance-shaped, sometimes curved adult leaves, club-shaped flower buds covered with a waxy, bluish white bloom, pink stamens with yellow anthers and urn-shaped fruit.

Description
The bark is smooth reddish brown at first and is shed in curling longitudinal flakes known as "minnirichi". Young branches are shiny red, covered  with a waxy, bluish white bloom. Flowering mainly occurs between May and September and the flowers have pink stamens with yellow anthers on the tip.

Taxonomy and naming
Eucalyptus caesia was first formally described in 1867 by George Bentham from a collection made by James Drummond in 1847 and the description was published in Flora Australiensis.

In 1982, Ian Brooker and Stephen Hopper described two subspecies, but the Australian Plant Census accepts these as synonyms:

The specific epithet (caesia) is a Latin word meaning "bluish grey" referring to the waxy cover of the small branches, flower buds and fruit.

Distribution and habitat
Caesia grows in crevices at the base of granite outcrops in scattered inland areas of the south-west, including in the Avon Wheatbelt and Mallee biogeographic regions. The species is known to be drought tolerant.

Ecology
Despite persisting as very small populations, this species does not seem to exhibit effects of inbreeding depression. Associated species include Eucalyptus crucis, Eucalyptus loxophleba, Allocasuarina huegeliana and Acacia lasiocalyx.

Use in horticulture
A form known as 'Silver Princess' is described as a "graceful weeping tree" that has an irregular and weeping form.

Propagation is from seed, which germinates readily.

See also
List of Eucalyptus species

References

External links
Eucalyptus caesia Association of Societies for Growing Australian Plants (ASGAP)
Illustration by Morag Newman
Illustration by Helen Fitzgerald

Trees of Australia
Eucalypts of Western Australia
Myrtales of Australia
caesia
Plants described in 1867
Mallees (habit)
Taxa named by George Bentham
Endemic flora of Southwest Australia